Tori Jovan Nelson (born August 26, 1976) is an American professional boxer. She is a former three-weight world champion, having held the WBC female middleweight title in 2011: the WIBA middleweight title in 2012; the WIBA welterweight from 2013 to 2014; and the WIBA super middleweight title in 2016. As of September 2020, she is ranked as the third best active female middleweight by The Ring by BoxRec.

Amateur career
Nelson is a three time Washington, D.C. Golden Gloves champion.

Professional career
Nelson was the World Boxing Council middleweight champion as well as the Women's International Boxing Association welterweight and super middleweight champion.

Nelson won a bout over Mia St. John.

Nelson lost a title bout by going the distance against 2-time Olympic gold medalist Claressa Shields.

Personal life
Nelson is a grandmother and works as a waitress at IHOP.
Nelson works at TITLE Boxing Club Ashburn where she uses her high energy, experience and enthusiasm to help members achieve their fitness and boxing goals!

Professional boxing record

References

External links 
 

1976 births
Living people
Middleweight boxers
World boxing champions
African-American boxers
African-American sportswomen
American women boxers
Super-middleweight boxers
World super-middleweight boxing champions
World Boxing Council champions
21st-century African-American sportspeople
21st-century African-American women
20th-century African-American sportspeople
20th-century African-American women
20th-century African-American people